Extreme sledding is a sport where riders do not simply sled down a hill, but use the sleds and their bodies to carry out various tricks, using apparatus such as ramps, rails, ledges, and some that are performed simply riding down the hill. The types of tricks that are carried out borrow certain characteristics from snowboarding, skateboarding, aggressive in-lining, BMXing, and motocross. Extreme Sledding can use many different types of equipment, with the most common being "knee-sleds" which are sleds where you ride on your knees, (sometimes strapped on).

Tricks

References

External links
 Mad River Rocket videos of Extreme Sledding
 ABC News, How Sledding Became an Extreme Sport

Sledding